Hazmat diving is underwater diving in a known hazardous materials environment. The environment may be contaminated by hazardous materials, the diving medium may be inherently a hazardous material, or the environment in which the diving medium is situated may include hazardous materials with a significant risk of exposure to these materials to members of the diving team. Special precautions, equipment and procedures are associated with hazmat diving so that the risk can be reduced to an acceptable level.

Scope
Hazmat diving describes diving operations which involve risk of exposure to hazardous materials beyond the usual range encountered in professional diving operations, where special precautions must be taken to reduce and mitigate the risks of exposure to these materials. Hazmat diving implies that specialised equipment will be required to dive at an acceptable level of risk.

Equipment

Most equipment used for hazmat diving is similar to other professional diving equipment, but may be modified to limit the risk of direct exposure of the diver and support personnel to the hazardous materials known or suspected to be present. The equipment appropriate to a hazmat diving operation will depend on the nature of the hazardous materials present and their potential effect on the diving team, and also to legislative constraints and the recommendations or requirements of codes of practice and organisational guidelines. The legal constraints commonly only allow the use of surface supplied diving equipment – scuba is generally not permitted for hazmat diving.

One of the features common to hazmat diving equipment is breathing gas exhaust systems that minimise the risk of backflow of contamination through the exhaust valves into the helmet. Most of these systems provide a slight over-pressure inside the helmet to prevent backflow in addition to non-return valves.
 Positive pressure full-face mask: – this system maintains a slightly higher internal pressure inside the mask so that any leakage will be outward. Generally only used for low risk contamination.
 Redundant exhaust valves: – Full-face masks and helmets can be fitted with exhaust systems in which the gas must pass through two valves in series to reach the outside environment, and therefore contaminants must pass through both sets of valves to get into the helmet.
 Free-flow breathing gas supply: – A supply of breathing gas in excess of the divers needs ensures that there is always an outward flow in the exhaust system, and reduces the risk of contaminated liquid getting in against the flow.
 Exhaust to atmosphere: – A reclaim type helmet which has an exhaust regulator can be used. The exhaled gas is not reclaimed but is returned to the atmosphere above the contaminated water. The reclaim valve prevents helmet squeeze by preventing exhaust flow except when there is a slight overpressure inside the helmet.

The material of the diving suit should be selected for best resistance to the contaminants, and ease of decontamination. In some cases the suit may only be able to safely resist the chemical attack of the contaminants for a limited period, and may have to be discarded after a single use.

Dry suits are used to isolate the diver from the diving medium. The helmet may be directly sealed to the suit. The suit is more easily decontaminated if it has a slick outer surface. Gloves will generally be integral parts of the suit to reduce the risk of leaks at cuff joints. Automatic suit dump valves are an additional potential leak and may be omitted from the suit if the helmet is directly sealed to the suit.

Where there may be atmospheric contamination in the vicinity of the dive site, both main and reserve breathing gas supply will be from high pressure storage cylinders.

Procedures
The procedures used in hazmat diving depend on the specific hazard and the assessed risks to health and safety of the diving team.

Risk management

Besides the ordinary hazards of the underwater environment and the special hazards of the specific dive site, the hazmat diving team must deal with the exceptional hazards of the contaminants that are classed as hazardous materials to which they may be exposed during a diving operation. The three major classes of pollutants are chemical, biological and radioactive materials, and the risks associated with them vary considerably.

The first stage of assessing the risk of a hazmat dive is to identify the contaminants present and assess the possible consequences of exposure and the type of equipment that may be used to protect the personnel, particularly the divers. Risk management will include assessing possible modes of contamination, available protective equipment, consequences of exposure, methods of mitigation, level of risk, and post dive health monitoring, as it is often not possible to exclude the possibility of contamination having occurred despite all precautions, particularly with pathogens.

Decontamination

The route to and from the contaminated  environment will pass through a decontamination station. After exiting the water all equipment will be decontaminated at this point before proceeding further. The decontamination procedures and precautions will depend on the nature of the hazardous materials to which the equipment has been exposed.

Decontamination may begin with a washdown with fresh water to remove the bulk of contamination. This may occur at the first convenient opportunity, including hosing down as the diver exits the water. The diver is then more comprehensively decontaminated using materials appropriate to the specific contaminants. The decontamination team may be at risk during decontamination procedures, and will wear suitable protection while in the decontamination area. Decontamination will start with the diver still fully dressed in all equipment, so it is necessary to work quickly and systematically to minimise the time the diver is required to endure the process. Particular attention is given to the sealing areas between helmet and suit, as these can trap contaminants and expose the diver to contact when the helmet is removed. Precautions are taken to contain and properly dispose of decontamination fluids. The decontamination team must be appropriately competent in the required procedures and equipment.

The diver will be stripped of diving equipment and suit by the decontamination team and will then go through a decontamination shower, or in some cases two showers in isolated compartments in series, followed by a medical examination and neurological survey, depending on the hazardous materials involved. Diving equipment must also be adequately decontaminated, and in some cases it may be necessary to dispose of equipment.

Health monitoring and screening of personnel

Occupational health monitoring is the ongoing systematic collection, analysis, and dissemination of exposure and health data on groups of workers. The Joint ILO/WHO Committee on Occupational Health at its 12th Session in 1995 defined an occupational health surveillance system as "a system which includes a functional capacity for data collection, analysis and dissemination linked to occupational health programmes".

The concept is frequently confused with medical screening. Health screening refers to the early detection and treatment of diseases associated with particular occupations, while workplace health surveillance refers to the removal of the causative factors.

Screening, in medicine, is a strategy used to look for as-yet-unrecognised conditions or risk markers. This testing can be applied to individuals or to a whole population. The people tested may not exhibit any signs or symptoms of a disease, or they might exhibit only one or two symptoms, which by themselves do not indicate a definitive diagnosis.

Screening interventions are designed to identify conditions which could at some future point turn into disease, thus enabling earlier intervention and management in the hope to reduce mortality and suffering from a disease. Although screening may lead to an earlier diagnosis, not all screening tests have been shown to benefit the person being screened; overdiagnosis, misdiagnosis, and creating a false sense of security are some potential adverse effects of screening. Additionally, some screening tests can be inappropriately overused. For these reasons, a test used in a screening program, especially for a disease with low incidence, must have good sensitivity in addition to acceptable specificity.

Specific environments and associated hazards

Nuclear diving
Nuclear diving is a kind of hazmat diving; the distinguishing feature is the exposure to radiation instead of a water borne contaminant. To this end, different precautions are required for nuclear diving, mainly, equipment which will not absorb radioactive contamination and pose a disposal problem after several dives. Moreover, exhaustive briefing of the group or diver for the specific environment he is going to work, depth, water temperature and potential radioactive sources.
Heat stress can also be a danger for the diver, in which case a cold water suit may be used: the cold water suit is a special canvas coverall which floods the outside of the diver's drysuit with chilled water, countering the dangerously high ambient water temperature. A dosimeter is used to ensure that the diver does not accumulate a dangerous dose of radiation during the dive, assisting in calculating the maximum length of the dive. In addition the dosimeter can also be used to find radiation hot spots, which can indicate areas in need of repair.

Sewer diving
Sewer diving is one of the most dangerous of all the hazmat jobs due to the disease vectors carried by raw sewage and because hypodermic needles and broken glass may contaminate the raw sewage, creating risks of contracting diseases through cuts and punctures.

Divers working in a dangerously contaminated environment wear a full drysuit with integral boots. Cut-resistant dry-gloves and helmet will seal directly to the drysuit, leaving no skin exposed to the environment. The diver will generally use a free flow diving helmet which continually supplies more air than the diver needs to breathe so that there is a constant outflow through the exhaust valve, as the internal pressure must be slightly higher than ambient to maintain the flow. A free flow helmet has a significantly lower risk of leakage back through the exhaust valve compared to a standard demand helmet where the exhaust valve must maintain a watertight seal against a slightly higher external pressure during inhalation. The risk of leakage through the exhaust valve of a demand system can be reduced in three ways. A series system of valves can be used - the exhaust gases must pass through two sets of exhaust valves before reaching the contaminated environment, and therefore contaminated water would have to leak back through both sets of valves to get to the diver. Positive pressure systems maintain a slightly higher pressure inside the mask or helmet than the ambient pressure on the outside, ensuring that any leaks flow from inside to outside, and reclaim type systems duct the exhaled breathing gas back to the control panel on the surface, but do not necessarily reclaim the exhaust gas. Combinations of these methods are possible depending on the assessed risk.

The drysuit will be made from a material resistant to the hazardous materials at the site: normally the diver wears a vulcanized rubber drysuit, which is relatively easy to decontaminate as it has a slick outer surface, but occasionally a neoprene or tri-laminate suit is needed. Often, a diver will wear extra protection over the drysuit to reduce the risk of a puncture: leather, PVC and nylon coveralls are used for this purpose.

In such diving, light levels are often very low and the water is usually very turbid, so divers may rely on touch to guide them, and they are connected via the umbilical to the surface. The umbilical serves as a supply of breathing gas, for communications, and as a lifeline to find and retrieve the diver in an emergency. It is also used as a guide to find the way back to the surface.

Risk and safety statistics

Legislation and codes of practice

History

References

Underwater work
Occupational safety and health